"Like I Used To" is a song by American singer-songwriters Sharon Van Etten and Angel Olsen. The song was written by Van Etten and Olsen, and produced by John Congleton. Van Etten and Olsen appear in the official music video which was released on May 20, 2021, with their hair styled in similar shag haircuts.

Background 
About the collaboration, Van Etten said in a press release: "Even though we weren’t super close, I always felt supported by Angel and considered her a peer in this weird world of touring. We highway high-fived many times along the way…. I finally got the courage in June of 2020 to reach out to see if she would want to sing together. I got greedy and quickly sent her a track I had been working on."

Olsen added: "I’ve met with Sharon here and there throughout the years and have always felt too shy to ask her what she’s been up to or working on. The song reminded me immediately of getting back to where I started, before music was expected of me, or much was expected of me, a time that remains pure and real in my heart."

The music video for the song was directed by Kimberly Stuckwisch, which was filmed at locations around Los Angeles and Joshua Tree.

Critical reception 
Pitchfork's Sam Sodomsky gave the song a "Best New Track" designation, saying, "The whole thing feels momentous, predestined to be a crowd-pleasing set closer, and the lyrics add to its casual grandeur." Under the Radar placed the song at No. 1 in their list of 10 Best Songs of the Week.

Charts

References 

2021 songs
2021 singles
Jagjaguwar singles
Song recordings produced by John Congleton
Sharon Van Etten songs